Karl Stein may refer to:

Karl Stein (politician)
Karl Stein (mathematician), eponym of Stein manifold